Eutorna leonidi is a moth in the family Depressariidae. It was described by Alexandr L. Lvovsky in 1979. It is found in Russia (south-eastern Siberia, Kunashir).

References

Moths described in 1979
Eutorna